Bozgüney is a town in Adana Province, Turkey.

Geography 

Bozgüney is a part of Tufanbeyli district which in turn is a part of Adana Province. It is at the extreme north of the province with coordinates . The population is 1120 as of 2012.

History 

The vicinity was inhabited throughout the history. The earliest settles were probably Luwians. The ruins of Comana, the Roman town, are a few kilometers west of Bozgüney. Although debatable, Comana is usually identified with Kummanni, the capital of the kingdom of Kizzuwatna during Hittite domination . The present residents are named Fakılar (a branch of Afshar Turkmens) who had migrated from north Turkistan to Anatolia in mid 14th century. In 1999 Bozgüney was declared township.

Economy 

Main economic activities are agriculture, animal husbandry and carpet weaving.

Status in 2014
According to Law act no 6360, all township municipalities will be abolished and they  will be merged into the district municipalities in 2014. Thus in 2014, Bozgüney will be a part of Tufanbeyli municipality.

References 

Populated places in Adana Province
Towns in Turkey
Populated places in Tufanbeyli District